Rubén Eduardo Quevedo (January 5, 1979 – June 7, 2016) was a Venezuelan professional baseball pitcher. He played in Major League Baseball (MLB) for the Chicago Cubs (2000) and Milwaukee Brewers (2001–03).

Career
Quevedo was signed as an international free agent by the Atlanta Braves in 1995 and was traded to the Cubs in 1999. He played with the Cubs in 2000 and was traded to the Milwaukee Brewers in 2001 for right-handed pitcher David Weathers. After three years with Milwaukee, Quevedo signed as a free agent with the Baltimore Orioles in 2004. He appeared in one game for Baltimore's AA affiliate, the Bowie Baysox.

Quevedo's most effective pitch was his changeup, which he threw with the same arm motion as his 89 MPH fastball. Meanwhile, his slider and curve were average. He allowed a significant number of fly balls, resulting in a high number of home runs allowed. In a four-year MLB career, Quevedo posted a 14–30 record with 237 strikeouts and a 6.15 ERA in 326.1 innings. During his minor league career he was named an AAA all-star in 2001 while pitching for the Iowa Cubs.

Quevedo died of a heart attack on June 7, 2016.

See also
 List of Major League Baseball players from Venezuela

References

External links
, or Retrosheet
Pura Pelota (Venezuelan Winter League)

1979 births
2016 deaths
Bowie Baysox players
Chicago Cubs players
Danville Braves players
Gulf Coast Braves players
Indianapolis Indians players
Iowa Cubs players
Macon Braves players
Major League Baseball pitchers
Major League Baseball players from Venezuela
Milwaukee Brewers players
Navegantes del Magallanes players
Sportspeople from Valencia, Venezuela
Tigres de Aragua players
Venezuelan expatriate baseball players in the United States